A sailing vessel may be a:
 Barque
 Bilander
 Brig
 Brigantine
 Cat boat
 Cutter (boat)
 Dhow
 Full-rigged ship
 Iron-hulled sailing ship
 Ketch
 Kite board
 Lugger
 Proa
 Sailboat
 Sailing yacht
 Sailing ship
 Schooner
 Snow (ship)
 Windjammer
 Yawl
 Windsurfer
A sailing craft would further include a:

 Ice boat
 Land yacht